Minuscule 199 (in the Gregory-Aland numbering), ε 1254 (Soden), is a Greek minuscule manuscript of the New Testament, on parchment. Palaeographically it has been assigned to the 12th century. It has complex contents and full marginalia.

Description 

The codex contains a complete text of the four Gospels on 229 parchment leaves (size ). The text is written in one column per page, in 27 lines per page (10 by 8 cm), in dark-brown ink, capital letters in gold.

There is also a division according to the Ammonian Sections (in Mark 234 Sections, the last 16:9), with references to the Eusebian Canons (written below Ammonian Section numbers, with a harmony).

Text 

The Greek text of the codex is a representative of the Byzantine text-type. Aland placed it in Category V.

History 

The manuscript was presented by Antonio Corbinelli († 1423) to the Benedictine library of S. Maria monastery.

Birch and Dean Burgon examined this codex. C. R. Gregory saw it in 1886.

It is currently housed at the Laurentian Library (Conv. Sopp. 160), at Florence.

See also 
 List of New Testament minuscules
 Biblical manuscript
 Textual criticism

References

Further reading

External links 
 Minuscule 199 at the CSNTM

Greek New Testament minuscules
12th-century biblical manuscripts